In Corpore is a 2020 Australian drama anthology film directed by Sarah Jayne and Ivan Malekin, starring Clara Francesca Pagone, Naomi Said, Kelsey Gillis, Sarah Timm, Christopher Dingli, Frank Fazio and Timothy McCown Reynolds.

Cast
 Clara Francesca Pagone as Julia
 Naomi Said as Anna
 Kelsey Gillis as Milana
 Sarah Timm as Rosalie
 Christopher Dingli as Manny
 Frank Fazio as Henri
 Timothy McCown Reynolds as Patrick
 Amelia June as Zara
 Simone Alamango as Nina
 Don Bridges as Tim
 Naomi Lisner as Anita

Release
The film was released on 26 November 2020.

Reception
Andrew Stover of Film Threat gave the film a score of 7.5/10 and called it "Fearlessly acted, adequately shot, and nicely edited".

Frank Scheck of The Hollywood Reporter wrote while the segments "aren’t particularly strong on their own", they "coalesce to form an incisive depiction of how conflicting desires and philosophies can affect relationships."

Hagan Osborne of FilmInk wrote that the film "offers a unique look at contemporary relationships."

References

External links
 
 

Australian drama films
2020 drama films